Isaac Parsons may refer to:
 Isaac Parsons (American military officer) (1814–1862), American planter, politician and military officer in Virginia
 Isaac Parsons (Virginia politician) (1752–1796), his grandfather, American planter, politician and militia officer in Virginia